Nabil Nahri (born 10 June 1958) is a former athlete and best Syrian sprinter of all time. He competed in the men's 100 metres and men's 200 metres at the 1980 Summer Olympics.

In the qualifying 100 m run, he took fifth place in his race (10.67 s), but did not advance to the further part of the competition (34th out of 65 sprinters). It was similar in the 200 m race, Nahri achieved fifth result in the heat (22.14 s) and did not qualify for the next round (40th out of 57 runners).

Two-time individual medalist at the 1979 Arab Athletics Championships, won gold in the 100 m and two silver in the 200 m and 4×100 m. Participated at the 1985 World Indoor Championships but was eliminated in the 60 and 200 metres heats.

Personal bests
Outdoor
100 m – 10.4 wind (Baghdad 1980)
100 m – 10.67 NR (Moscow 1980)
200 m – 21.45 NR (Baghdad 1979)
Indoor
60 m indoor – 7.07 (Paris 1985)
200 m indoor – 23.47 (Paris 1985)
400m – 48.8 (Damascus 1978)

Competition record

References

1958 births
Living people
Athletes (track and field) at the 1980 Summer Olympics
Syrian male sprinters
Olympic athletes of Syria
Place of birth missing (living people)
20th-century Syrian people